Terror in Rome, also known as Violence for Kicks, is a 1976 Italian "poliziottesco" film.  written and directed  by Sergio Grieco and Massimo Felisatti, credited as Segri & Ferrara. It is loosely inspired by the Circeo Massacre, in which three young men abducted, and then raped and tortured, two young women over a two-day period.

Plot
A gang of bikers terrorize the streets of Rome.

Cast
Antonio Sabàto as Commissioner De Gregori
 Pierre Marfurt as Stefano Donini
 Cesare Barro as Bruno
 Franca Gonella  as Marco's sister
Pupo De Luca as Marshall Turrini
 Gianluca Farnese as Marco Liberatori
 Giuliana Melis  as Giovanna
Giacomo Rossi Stuart as Donini
Gloria Piedimonte as Elena

Production
Terror in Rome was filmed at Cave Film Studio in Rome and on location in Rome.

Release
Terror in Rome was distributed theatrically in Italy by C.I.A. on 12 August 1976. The film grossed a total of 518,107,310 lire domestically. It was released in France in 1979 as La Nuit de excitcées with additional sex scenes.

Reception
In his analysis of the film, Roberto Curti heavily criticized it, noting that "the story is stretched beyond belief" and that "the budget is so poor that Terror In Rome could well pass for a Turkish movie", and eventually complaining that "the film is so badly written and directed that it is hard to believe it came from such an experienced filmmaker as Grieco and a renowned writer as Felisatti."

See also 
 List of Italian films of 1976

References

Footnotes

Sources

External links

1970s crime films
Poliziotteschi films
Films directed by Sergio Grieco
1970s Italian films